Adam O'Brien (born 26 October 1977) is an Australian professional rugby league football coach who is the head coach of the Newcastle Knights in the NRL.

He was previously an assistant coach at the Melbourne Storm and the Sydney Roosters.

Coaching career

Melbourne Storm
O'Brien started his professional coaching career as an assistant to Brad Arthur with the Melbourne Storm under-20s side before working as a development coach for Melbourne and spending five years alongside Craig Bellamy as an assistant to the NRL side.

Sydney Roosters
After 11 years at the Melbourne club, O'Brien joined the Sydney Roosters as an attacking coach under head coach Trent Robinson in 2019. He finished his time with the Roosters as a part of their 2019 NRL Grand Final winning team.

Newcastle Knights
In September 2019, O'Brien signed a three-year contract to become the Head Coach of the Newcastle Knights starting in 2020. Newcastle demonstrated a marked improvement in performance over previous seasons, finishing in 7th place and reaching the first of week of finals. They finished the year with 11 wins, 1 draw and 9 losses. In February 2021, the Newcastle club extended his contract until the end of 2024.

O'Brien guided Newcastle to a 7th placed finish in the 2021 NRL season as the club qualified for the finals.  In the first week of the 2021 Finals Series, Newcastle were defeated 28-20 by Parramatta in the elimination final which ended their season.

Head Coaching Statistics

Controversy
On 10 February 2021, O'Brien was named as the person involved in an alleged incident at a Newcastle racecourse. It was alleged that O'Brien had the altercation in one of the toilet blocks at the racecourse and had to be ejected from the venue by security. One security guard spoke to the media about the incident saying “The coach was arrogant and belligerent and even used the old, ‘Don’t you know who I am?’ line when we escorted him out of the men’s room and told him to cool it". This was later refuted by the Newcastle club in a statement which read "Reports alleging those Knights staff were intoxicated, disruptive and ejected from the venue are incorrect. This has been confirmed by NJC staff and independent eyewitnesses. Information gathered confirms all Knights representatives always acted professionally and appropriately, NJC has confirmed there were no incident reports recorded."

References

External links
Newcastle Knights profile

1977 births
Australian rugby league coaches
Newcastle Knights coaches
Living people